Robert  or Rob Simmons may refer to:

Rob Simmons (born 1943), U.S. Representative from Connecticut
Rob Simmons (rugby union) (born 1989), Australian rugby union player
Robert G. Simmons (1891–1969), U.S. Representative from Nebraska
Robert Simmons (South Carolina politician), state legislator who serves in the South Carolina Senate from Berkeley County
Robert Malcolm Simmons (born 1938), director of the Randall Division of Cell and Molecular Biophysics at King's College London
Bob Simmons (surfer) (Robert Wilson Simmons, 1919–1954), early surfing pioneer
Robert John Simmons (1837–1863), Bermudian who served in the American Civil War
Rob Simmons, character from the Mighty Orbots
Mr. Robert Simmons, fictional character from the Nickelodeon animated series Hey Arnold!

See also
Bob Simmons (disambiguation)